LIS (Language d'Implementation de Systèmes) was a system implementation programming language designed by Jean Ichbiah, who later designed Ada.

LIS was used to implement the compiler for the Ada-0 subset of Ada at Karlsruhe on the BS2000 Siemens operating system. Later on the Karlsruhe Ada compilation system got rewritten in Ada-0 itself, which was easy, because LIS and Ada-0 are very close.

Notes

References

 Jean D. Ichbiah, The System implementation language LIS, Louveciennes, France: Compagnie internationale pour l'informatique, 1976.

Procedural programming languages